Audrey Coulter is an equestrian who has won several major horse jumping competitions and participated in the Rio Olympics. She is the daughter of financier James Coulter and Penny Coulter.

Early life 
Audrey began riding horses when she was three years old, living with her family in the suburbs of Woodside on the San Francisco Peninsula. She and her sister Saer rode for years at Millennium Farms, which belonged to their neighbors across the street. Audrey was showing and jumping horses by the time she was seven.

Personal life 
Audrey graduated from Dartmouth College in 2015 with a degree in Economics and minor in Chemistry.

Career 
Audrey has had many successes early in her horse jumping career, starting from an early age. She earned a Team Silver at the North American Junior Championships in 2010 and placed fourth in the Randolph College/USEF National Junior Jumper Individual Championship. At age 18 she was one of six American young riders invited to contest the European Youngster Cup, which was held along with the World Cup Show Jumping Finals in Leipzig, Germany in late April 2011. She finished in 12th place riding Victory DA. in 2014, at age 21, she won the $280,000 Adequan Grand Prix at the FTI Consulting Winter Equestrian Festival on a horse called Acorte, knocking out the 1st and 2nd ranked riders in the world who finished 2nd and 3rd behind her.

In 2015, she was one of four riders on the United States team that earned 10th place at the 2015 CSIO Gijón, with Audrey riding Capital Colnardo. She and Capital Colnado later took third place in the Longines International Grand Prix in Dublin in July 2016. Later that year, she and Capital Colnardo had their first major class win in 2016 in the $100,000 Longines FEI World Cup™ at the Sacramento International Horse Show in a course designed by 2016 Rio Olympic showjumping course designer, Guilherme Jorge.

References 

Year of birth missing (living people)
Living people
American show jumping riders
Equestrians at the 2016 Summer Olympics
Dartmouth College alumni
People from Woodside, California